Jagdeep Kamboj Goldy is an Indian politician and the MLA representing the Jalalabad, Punjab Assembly constituency in the Punjab Legislative Assembly. He is a member of the Aam Aadmi Party. He was elected as the MLA in the 2022 Punjab Legislative Assembly election, defeating Sukhbir Singh Badal.

Career
As of 2022 he is the youth leader and leader of the Youth Wing of AAP Punjab. He is the AAP leader for Jalalabad district. In December 2021, he was appointed the AAP candidate for Jalalabad Assembly constituency.

Member of Legislative Assembly
He was elected as the MLA in the 2022 Punjab Legislative Assembly election defeating the president of Shiromani Akali Dal, Sukhbir Singh Badal by a margin of 30,930 votes. The Aam Aadmi Party gained a strong 79% majority in the sixteenth Punjab Legislative Assembly by winning 92 out of 117 seats in the 2022 Punjab Legislative Assembly election. MP Bhagwant Mann was sworn in as Chief Minister on 16 March 2022.
Committee assignments of Punjab Legislative Assembly
Chairman (2022–23) Committee on Papers laid/to be laid on the table and Library

Electoral Performance for Punjab Assembly

References

Year of birth missing (living people)
Living people
People from Jalalabad
Punjab, India MLAs 2022–2027
Aam Aadmi Party politicians from Punjab, India